The 1960 Air Force Falcons football team represented the United States Air Force Academy as an independent during the 1960 NCAA University Division football season. Led by third-year head coach Ben Martin, the Falcons played their home games at DU Stadium in Denver, Colorado. They were outscored by their opponents 178–147 and finished with a record of 4–6.

Memorial Stadium in Baltimore. Heisman Trophy winner Joe Bellino scored three first half touchdowns and also had an interception. The two academies met in even-numbered years (except 1962 and 1964) through 1971, and have played annually in the competition (with Army) for the Commander-in-Chief's Trophy, first awarded in 1972.

Schedule

References

Air Force
Air Force Falcons football seasons
Air Force Falcons football